Cristian Portilla Rodríguez (born 28 August 1988) is a Spanish footballer who plays as an attacking midfielder.

Club career
Portilla was born in Santander, Cantabria. The son of a former footballer, he entered local Racing de Santander's youth academy at nine after allegedly receiving an offer from Deportivo de La Coruña after a tournament, which his father turned down.

After playing with the reserves, Portilla first appeared with the professionals on 27 October 2005 during a 1–1 away draw against Real Zaragoza, playing two more La Liga games during the season. In his first years he could only add another appearance with the main squad and, in January 2008, was loaned to Racing de Ferrol who were finally relegated from the second division.

To further continue his development as a player (still aged 20), Portilla was loaned again the following campaign, moving to SD Ponferradina in the third level. For 2009–10 he was bought by Sporting de Gijón of the top flight, with Santander having an option to re-acquire the player in three years; in his first, he spent time with both the first and second teams, the latter in division three.

In late December 2010, Portilla left Asturias and joined Super League Greece club Aris Thessaloniki FC, signing a two-and-a-half-year contract. He left one year later, due to unpaid wages.

Portilla did not settle with any team the following years, representing CD Atlético Baleares, Glyfada FC, Budapest Honvéd FC, Mitra Kukar FC, Ermis Aradippou FC, FC Tatabánya and CD Mensajero. On 17 January 2017, he moved to the North American Soccer League with the San Francisco Deltas, winning the Soccer Bowl in his first season even though he did not appear in the decisive match against the New York Cosmos due to injury.

On 8 February 2018, Portilla signed with Ottawa Fury FC of the United Soccer League following a two-week pre-season trial, joining former Deltas teammates Nana Attakora and Maxim Tissot. Eleven months later, he joined Lithuanian A Lyga runners-up FK Žalgiris.

Club statistics

References

External links

1988 births
Living people
Spanish footballers
Footballers from Santander, Spain
Association football midfielders
La Liga players
Segunda División players
Segunda División B players
Tercera División players
Rayo Cantabria players
Racing de Santander players
Racing de Ferrol footballers
SD Ponferradina players
Sporting de Gijón B players
Sporting de Gijón players
CD Atlético Baleares footballers
CD Mensajero players
Unionistas de Salamanca CF players
CD Tropezón players
Super League Greece players
Football League (Greece) players
Aris Thessaloniki F.C. players
A.O. Glyfada players
Nemzeti Bajnokság I players
Budapest Honvéd FC players
FC Tatabánya players
Mitra Kukar players
Cypriot First Division players
Ermis Aradippou FC players
North American Soccer League players
USL Championship players
San Francisco Deltas players
Ottawa Fury FC players
FK Žalgiris players
Spain youth international footballers
Spanish expatriate footballers
Expatriate footballers in Greece
Expatriate footballers in Hungary
Expatriate footballers in Indonesia
Expatriate footballers in Cyprus
Expatriate soccer players in the United States
Expatriate soccer players in Canada
Expatriate footballers in Lithuania
Spanish expatriate sportspeople in Greece
Spanish expatriate sportspeople in Hungary
Spanish expatriate sportspeople in Indonesia
Spanish expatriate sportspeople in Cyprus
Spanish expatriate sportspeople in the United States
Spanish expatriate sportspeople in Canada
Spanish expatriate sportspeople in Lithuania